Interstate 83 (I-83) is an Interstate Highway located in the states of Maryland and Pennsylvania in the Eastern United States. Its southern terminus is at a signalized intersection with Fayette Street in Baltimore, Maryland; its northern terminus is at I-81 near Harrisburg, Pennsylvania.

Most of the route south of Lemoyne, Pennsylvania, is a direct replacement of U.S. Route 111 (US 111), a former spur of US 11.

Route description

|-
|MD
|
|-
|PA
|
|-
|Total
|
|}

Maryland

Jones Falls Expressway

The Jones Falls Expressway (JFX) is a  freeway that carries I-83 from Downtown Baltimore to the northern suburbs. It is the area's true north–south artery, because I-95 runs mostly east–west through the city. Its southern terminus is at Fayette Street, and its northern terminus is at Maryland Route 25 (MD 25), just north of the Baltimore Beltway (I-695). Inside Baltimore, the road is maintained not by the Maryland State Highway Administration (MDSHA), which controls most freeways in the state, but by the city's Department of Transportation.

The freeway begins at an at-grade four-way intersection between the JFX, Fayette Street, and President Street, located in close proximity to the Phoenix Shot Tower. President Street continues south along the eastern edge of the central business district (CBD) to terminate at a traffic circle in Harbor East. Fayette Street serves as an access route into the downtown area.

Passing beneath the Orleans Street Viaduct (part of US 40), the JFX runs north, passing near the Washington Monument. The curve is located between the Guilford Avenue and Preston Street overpasses. Within the curve, the southbound JFX interchanges with MD 2, with an exit to St. Paul Street and an entrance from Charles Street.

Having passed this curve, the JFX begins to parallel MD 25, going under the Howard Street Bridge and interchanging with Maryland Avenue and North Avenue (which carries US 1 and US 40 Truck) before continuing north past Druid Lake, forming the northeastern boundary of Druid Hill Park. Running northwest out of the city center, the JFX is paralleled by its namesake river, the Jones Falls, on one side, and MTA Maryland's Baltimore Light RailLink line on the other. Closer to downtown, the light rail line peels off in a different direction, while the falls flows directly underneath the elevated freeway.

After interchanging with Cold Spring Lane and Northern Parkway (between which lies the Cylburn Arboretum), the JFX exits Baltimore, entering Baltimore County. Passing close to Mt. Washington Pediatric Hospital, Mount Saint Agnes College, and Jones Falls Park, the route skirts the edge of Lake Roland before interchanging with Ruxton Road just south of the Baltimore Beltway.

Meanwhile, the JFX continues for another  in a four-lane divided format before terminating at an at-grade intersection with MD 25 (Falls Road). I-83 and I-695 split off at the southern terminus of the Baltimore-Harrisburg Expressway, and I-695 continues its eastward trek toward Towson and Parkville.

Baltimore-Harrisburg Expressway

After separating from the Beltway, I-83 is now known as the Baltimore-Harrisburg Expressway. Running due north away from the Beltway, the route parallels MD 45 (York Road), the former route of US 111. Passing to the west of Timonium and Cockeysville, I-83 leaves the suburban belt around Baltimore and enters rural Baltimore County just north of Hunt Valley at Shawan Road. I-83 and MD 45 continue to parallel one another through the northern portion of the county, with MD 45 crossing over I-83 once, at an interchange. This segment of I-83 has several sections with higher than usual gradients.

The only major settlement encountered by I-83 along this stretch is Monkton, reached via MD 137. To the west of I-83, MD 137 connects with the northern terminus of MD 25, I-83's former companion to the south.

Pennsylvania

Throughout Pennsylvania, I-83 is named the Veterans of Foreign Wars of the United States Memorial Highway. I-83 enters Pennsylvania, crossing the Mason–Dixon line and passing to the east of Shrewsbury as it runs due north toward York. The route bypasses the boroughs of Loganville and Jacobus before entering the city of York.

I-83 has a business route through downtown York, known as I-83 Business (I-83 Bus). The business route follows the former path of US 111, while I-83 turns northeast and then north again to bypass the urban area. Near Pennsylvania Route 462 (PA 462), the Lincoln Highway, the Interstate turns west for a short distance, then north again to an interchange with US 30. Beyond US 30, I-83 resumes its straight path, running due north out of York and passing to the west of Emigsville.

North of PA 297, I-83 is known as the Susquehanna Expressway. It maintains this name as it passes to the south and west of Valley Green, continuing north toward Harrisburg. South of Harrisburg, I-83 has an interchange with I-76 (Pennsylvania Turnpike). North of I-76, I-83 continues due north, passing through New Cumberland, before an interchange with the eastern terminus of PA 581 in Lemoyne.

After the interchange with PA 581, I-83 is known as the Capital Beltway. The highway turns due east and crosses the Susquehanna River over the John Harris Bridge, south of Downtown Harrisburg, passing through Paxtang before encountering I-283 and US 322 at the Eisenhower Interchange. Within the interchange, I-83 exits from itself, with each direction of traffic following a one-lane ramp; facing east, I-83's former lanes become US 322, while, facing north, I-283's lanes become I-83. The interchanges includes ramps to local roads as well. From this point northbound to exit 51, traffic is often congested during daylight hours. I-83 and westbound US 322 continue north toward US 22 and I-81, I-283 goes due south toward the turnpike and PA 283's western terminus, and eastbound US 322 goes due east toward Hershey.

Beyond this interchange, I-83 runs due north again through eastern Harrisburg, interchanging with US 22 northeast of the CBD, before terminating at a three-way semidirectional interchange with I-81.

History

Pennsylvania
I-83 was one of the first Interstate Highways built in Pennsylvania. Much of its routing through the state follows a freeway bypass of the since decommissioned US 111. The route received the I-83 designation in 1960. The first section built (opened 1954), runs from PA 392 in Newberry Township north to PA 114 in Fairview Township. The entire highway was completed in 1971 with the massive Eisenhower Interchange in Harrisburg.

The interchange with PA 851 near Shrewsbury was reconstructed into a diverging diamond interchange, which opened to traffic on June 28, 2021.

Jones Falls Expressway
The first Interstate to be built in Baltimore was the JFX; the Greater Baltimore Committee pushed to enact legislation from the Baltimore City Council in 1955. It was the first to be constructed due to community opposition to the other planned freeways within the city. By the early 1960s, the JFX was completed as far as Guilford Avenue, within the city limits. It was completed as far as Pleasant Street in the downtown area by 1983, but the remaining  to I-95 were canceled in September 1982. To compensate for the loss of the remainder of the JFX, the portion in situ was extended to Fayette Street by 1987, and the Jones Falls Boulevard project substantially rebuilt  of President Street, across from the JFX at Fayette Street, to allow the traffic to and from the Interstate to be collected and distributed from the surrounding city streets. By 1990, the project was completed.

Due to community opposition to the other freeway plans being produced by city officials, the JFX was the very first limited-access highway to be completed within the city of Baltimore and remained so for several years. Originally, the JFX was to continue through the Southeast Baltimore neighborhoods of Fell's Point and Canton to a junction with the then-planned I-95, but opposition from residents of those neighborhoods successfully blocked that proposal. As a result, I-83 became the first Maryland road in the Interstate Highway System.

Planning

As part of the planning for an east–west route through Baltimore, the alignment of the JFX underwent various modifications. Under the original plan for freeways in Baltimore, the 1962 Baltimore 10-D Interstate System, the JFX would have junctioned I-70N (which became I-70 in 1975) and I-95, which were planned to follow an east–west route through the southern edge of the CBD, near the southeastern edge of the CBD. The JFX would end at roughly the same location where it currently does. As a result of community opposition to other portions of the 10-D System, the 1969 Baltimore 3-A Interstate and Boulevard System was adopted by the city. In this plan, the JFX would continue south along its present alignment then turn east and pass through the Fell's Point neighborhood on a six-lane elevated viaduct, before continuing east along Boston Street to junction I-95 (which was also rerouted to its current alignment) north of the Fort McHenry Tunnel. In the mid-1970s, this plan was modified due to fears that the viaduct would result in destruction of the Fell's Point area, which contains many historic properties. Under the modification, I-83 would continue south and descend into a six-lane underwater tunnel beneath the Inner Harbor, then turn east under the harbor, pass to the south of Fell's Point, return to the surface in the Canton area and continue to I-95.

Under this plan, I-83 was expected to act mostly as a northerly spur to and from the CBD and as an easterly spur to and from the CBD; through traffic was expected to be a small proportion of the total amount making use of the route. I-83's terminus at I-95 would have been a full three-way freeway-to-freeway interchange, with a full complement of ramps provided for access to and from Boston Street and O'Donnell Street. When construction began on I-95 through East Baltimore in the mid-1970s, a short six-lane section was built within the vicinity of the planned I-83 interchange. This was done in anticipation of I-83 connecting the CBD to I-95, the rest of which carries at least eight lanes of traffic throughout the city.

Truncation

By 1963, the JFX was completed as far south as Guilford Avenue and, by the mid-1970s, was extended to Monument Street. By 1983, the route extended all the way to Pleasant Street, with a dead-end bridge stub indicating plans to continue south along the 3-A alignment to I-95.

Robert Douglas, then the chief of the Interstate Division for Baltimore City (IDBC), stated at the time that the very high financial costs of the I-83 extension (estimated at $609 million in the early 1980s, and likely to reach $1 billion with inflation taken into account) led to the cancelation of the segment. As a result, the JFX was truncated at Fayette Street, ending at an at-grade intersection.

Other roadways in the canceled I-83 corridor also benefited from major reconstruction and rehabilitation. The federal funding planned to be used for the I-83 extension was instead cross-transferred to other highway projects; routes that may have benefited include I-97, I-195, I-370, and the upgrade of John Hanson Highway to I-595.

Future

As Congress worked toward reauthorization of the Surface Transportation Act, the Greater Lynchburg Chamber of Commerce and other groups in Virginia wanted I-83 extended southward to provide bypasses for Charlottesville, Lynchburg, and Danville, and to link those cities to Greensboro, North Carolina. By June 1991, Robert LaLone, director of programs for the Lynchburg Chamber, admitted that an Interstate was unlikely, but upgrading of US 29, with bypasses included, is more likely.

The possibility of extending I-83 (rather than I-99) north to Rochester, New York, was discussed at the October 2002 I-99 Task Force meeting. However, part of the proposed route on US 11/US 15 has since been rebuilt as a four-lane surface road that does not meet Interstate standards. Expensive additional reconstruction, including new interchanges, service roads, and realignments, would be necessary. The farthest north that I-83 could be extended currently would be Benvenue, Pennsylvania, on a bridge over the Susquehanna River, where a recently built freeway section of US 22/US 322 (Dauphin Bypass) downgrades to an undivided four-lane road. Recently however, the Central Susquehanna Valley Thruway, a  freeway project along the proposed corridor near Shamokin Dam, Pennsylvania, has been approved and is under construction as of 2016.

In 2005, Walter Sondheim, a prominent Baltimore city planner unveiled a proposal to tear down the elevated portion of the JFX that leads into downtown. In the JFX's place, President Street would be extended north to Eager Street, where the elevated section ends. City officials have since offered tentative support for the idea, though it is unlikely that any action will be taken until about 2020, when the current elevated structure will need an overhaul if it is to remain in use. If the downtown JFX were demolished, Baltimore would join San Francisco, Boston, and Milwaukee to become among the large US cities that have removed some of their downtown elevated freeways. On May 17, 2009, The Baltimore Sun revealed a plan by Rummel, Klepper & Kahl LLP, to tear down  of the JFX to create an urban boulevard that would help connect downtown to the east side of the city, and Johns Hopkins Hospital.

From 2012 to 2015, the I-83/PA 581 interchange outside of Harrisburg, Pennsylvania, was modified. Formerly, I-83 was reduced to one lane going northbound through the interchange, resulting in frequent traffic jams during peak travel times. The northbound part of the highway was widened, one bridge was replaced and several exits in the vicinity were reconfigured. A second project started in 2016, with work to be completed from its northern terminus at I-81 to just past the Union Deposit Road interchange. The project, expected to be completed in 2021, will reconstruct two interchanges and associated overpasses, as well as widen adjacent sections of the highway to six throughlanes.

In York, Pennsylvania, a reconstruction of the Mt. Rose Avenue (PA 124) interchange is being completed in anticipation of a future widening of I-83 around the east and north sides of the city. Also, studies are being done north of town to help ease traffic in a section heavily traveled by trucks.

Exit list
Exit numbers in Pennsylvania were changed in April 2001 from being sequence-based to milemarker-based.

Auxiliary routes
I-83 has one auxiliary route: I-283, a connector from I-83 south to I-76 (Pennsylvania Turnpike) and PA 283 southeast of Harrisburg.

Business route

Interstate 83 Business (I-83 Bus.) is a short Interstate business loop in York, Pennsylvania. It begins at a semidirectional T interchange with I-83 south of York, continuing north as a freeway for  before the freeway ends at a partial interchange with South George Street. The route continues north along George Street through downtown York, intersecting PA 74 and PA 462 before leaving the city and intersecting US 30. Here, PA 181 begins and runs north concurrent with I-83 Bus. for a short distance before I-83 Bus. ends at an interchange with I-83.

From its designation in 1961 until the designation of I-376 Bus. in 2009, I-83 Bus. was the only business route of an Interstate Highway in Pennsylvania.

Major intersections

See also

References

External links

 Interstate Guide - I-83
 I-83 in Maryland at AARoads.com
 I-83 in Pennsylvania at AARoads.com
 I-83 at MDRoads.com
 Pennsylvania Highways: I-83
 Maryland Roads - I-83
 Pennsylvania Roads - I-83
 Steve Anderson's DCroads.net: Baltimore-Harrisburg Expressway (I-83)
 Steve Anderson's DCroads.net: Jones Falls Expressway (I-83)
 Roads to the Future: Baltimore Harbor Interstate Map
 Kelly, Jacques. "JFX is a long stretch of history," The Baltimore Sun, Saturday, February 7, 2009. 

 
83
83
Roads in the Harrisburg, Pennsylvania area
83
Roads in Baltimore
Roads in Baltimore County, Maryland
Transportation in York County, Pennsylvania
Transportation in Cumberland County, Pennsylvania
Transportation in Dauphin County, Pennsylvania